This is a list of the seasons completed by the San Francisco Dons men's basketball team.

Seasons

  Phil Vukicevich coached the first 6 games of the season, going 0–6. Interim coach Bob Gaillard went 10–10 and 8–6 in conference.
  Includes Bob Gaillard's 10–10 record and 8–6 in conference from 1970-71.
  Jessie Evans coached the first 12 games of the season, going 4–8. Interim coach Eddie Sutton went 6–13 and 5–9 in conference.

References

 
Lists of college basketball seasons in the United States
San Francisco Dons basketball seasons